Syanno District is a district (raion) in Vitebsk Region, Belarus.

Notable residents 
 Zair Azgur (1908, Maǔčany village – 1995), Belarusian sculptor 
Piotr Mašeraǔ (1919, Šyrki village – 1980), Soviet partisan in World War II and leader of Soviet Belarus between 1965 – 1980
Lavon Rydleŭski (1903, Uljanavičy village - 1953), active participant in the Belarusian independence movement and an anti-Soviet resistance and a prominent member of the Belarusian diaspora.

References

Districts of Vitebsk Region